Goodnites (formerly Pull-Ups Goodnites; known as DryNites in the United Kingdom and most markets outside of North America) are diapers designed for managing bedwetting. Goodnites are produced by Kimberly-Clark. The product has also been seen titled as Huggies Goodnites on official Huggies branded webpages.

Goodnites constitute the middle level of Kimberly-Clark's line of disposable diapers, being targeted at children, teens and young adults. The company also produces Huggies diapers for babies, Pull-Ups training pants for toddlers undergoing toilet training, Poise pads for adult women, and Depend incontinence products for adults in general.

Product History

1990s 

 1994 - Goodnites released
 The original Goodnites were released in 1994. 
 They came in two sizes: medium (45-65 lbs) and large (65-85 lbs).
 1999 - Goodnites released a new size
 In 1999, Kimberly-Clark introduced a new extra-large size (85 lbs-125 lbs and up).

2000s 

 2001
 A "Cloth-Like Cover" replaced the previous cover.
 2003 - Goodnites introduce a new fit
 Kimberly-Clark introduced the "Trim-Fit" style (a drastic reduction in padding thickness and the overall size of the pull-up).
 2004 - Goodnites introduces gender-specific
 Prior to 2004, Goodnites were unisex, plain-white pull-ups with only a faux tag printed on the back.
 Kimberly-Clark introduced gender-specific Goodnites with absorbency zoned for boys and girls. 
 Medium Goodnites became small/medium and were designed to fit kids 38-65 pounds. 
 The small/medium size is the equivalent of size 4-8 underwear (Size 8 US is 23.5in Waist).
 Large and extra large Goodnites were combined into large/extra-Large for kids from 60-125+ pounds (Height for healthy weight of 125 pounds is 4' 11" up to 5' 8" (The CDC states that the Average Height for Men is 69in or 5' 9" with an average waist size of 40.3in  while the Average for Women is 63.6in or 5' 3.6" with the average waist size of 38.7in)).  
 The large/extra-large size is equivalent to size 8-14 underwear (Size 14 US is 27in Waist).
2007 - Boxer and Sleep Shorts
Goodnites brand releases the boxers and sleep shorts

2010s 

 2011
 Goodnites boxers and sleep shorts disappeared from the official website
 2012 - Bed Mats introduced
 Goodnites released the bed mats product
2014
Goodnites Tru-fit where released
 2017 - Goodnites release a new size
 A new extra-small size was introduced for both boys and girls. It fits clothing sizes 3-5 and is designed for children weighing 28-45 lbs.
 2019 - Logo style updates and new products
 Goodnites has updated the logo online and is stating "New Look, Coming Soon The same protection you trust, with brand new packaging!"
 Goodnites Tru-fit was discontinued
 Goodnites introduced the absorbent inserts

2020s 

 2021 - Goodnites released new sizes
 In early 2021, Kimberly-Clark adjusted the sizing of Goodnites and introduced a new extra-large size, intended for those with kids' underwear size 14 to 20 as well as adult sizes up to a 6 waist (corresponding to up to a  waist) and weight from 95–140 pounds or more (43-63+ kilograms), which are partially aimed toward teenagers and young adults. 
 Extra-small now ranges range from 28-43 pounds (13-20 kilograms) and small/medium at 43-68 pounds (20-31 kilograms), or underwear size 4 to 8. 
 The previous large/extra-large size was downgraded to large and revised to be recommended for underwear sized 8 to 12 or weighing 68-95 pounds (31-43 kilograms).
2023
Goodnites absorbent inserts are not mentioned as a product from the Goodnites brand

Effectiveness 
In a study published in the Bulletin of Pediatric Health, Goodnites and similar bedwetting underpants were analyzed for effectiveness in relieving social anxiety related to bedwetting for boys ages 7 to 13 and for girls ages 5 to 15. Nearly five-hundred boys who wore diapers on a nightly-basis were compared to a control group experiencing the same problem but did not wear diapers to bed. 625 girls who wore diapers on a nightly-basis were compared to a control group experiencing the same problem but did not wear diapers to bed. The study found, predictably, that nearly all of the children were fearful of being discovered by their peers, while 48% of the 7-to-10-year-olds and 81% of the 11-to-13-year-olds described Goodnites, in particular, being "a little" or "very babyish." Despite these statistics, 60% said they would not go to bed without them.  Asked about what they feared upon "discovery," the top worries were verbal teasing (89%) and loss of friends (61%) followed closely by physical bullying (gaining bullies, being beaten up by a peer, given wedgies, swirlies, or other kinds of playground bullying) 57%, and being compared to a baby (51%).  Actual incidences of bullying due to bedwetting were found to be higher among the wearers than in the control, leading the study's author to conclude that the Goodites and similar products did successfully add to the wearers' confidence, so that they engaged more in what was dubbed for the purposes of the study "risky behavior" (e.g. going to sleepovers, participation in camping trips); 17% of the experimental group reported bullying, while only 11% of the control reported bullying.

Current Products

Goodnites Nighttime Underwear 
Goodnites are designed to be worn to bed in order to prevent wetting of the sheets and pajamas in case of an accident. Goodnites are pull-up style rather than tab-style to make it easier for the wearer to change their own diaper and to reduce the chance of stigma associated with having to wear diapers by making the experience more similar to wearing underwear.

Goodnites Bed Mats 
Goodnites released Goodnites Bed Mats in April 2012. They can be used to protect the mattress from bedwetting accidents. These are made more for that occasional bedwetter. For a person who wets maybe once a week, the Goodnite would be wasted after two nights of wearing. These protect the mattress in the event of an accident. Goodnites Bed Mats feature adhesive to allow them to stick to the bed.

Discontinued Products

Boxers & Sleep Shorts 

Goodnites Boxers (for boys) and Sleep Shorts (for girls) were a product manufactured by Kimberly-Clark from 2007–2009, and distributed from 2007–2010. They were designed to look and feel like boxers. They were blue for boys and pink for girls. The outer covering was cloth-like to look like a pair of boxers. The inside was a pull-up.

As of 2011, Kimberly-Clark makes no reference to this product line on the official Goodnites website.

Tru-Fit
The Tru-Fit line was a pad-and-pants system that combined an absorbent, disposable liner inside a rubberized, waterproof pair of boxer shorts. They came in 4 styles. Likely released in 2014 and then discontinued in 2019 according to the company Facebook page stating, "Our GoodNites Tru-Fit underwear have been discontinued, however, you may be able to find the Tru-Fit underwear through online retailers until inventories are depleted."

Goodnites Inserts 
In 2019, Goodnites introduced inserts for boys who experience minor leakage while sleeping. They fit inside underwear briefs and are one size fits most. They are not recommended for heavy to complete loss of bladder control or for full bedwetting accidents. In 2021, inserts for girls were introduced with similar functionality. They fit inside a standard girls' underwear brief.

As of 2023, the official Goodnites website (owned by Kimberly-Clark) makes no mention of the product.

Competition

When they were first released, Goodnites were an alternative to waterproof mattress pads and more expensive disposable youth diapers intended for the disabled; as a result, they lacked any direct competition. By 2000, Goodnites' primary competition consisted of store brand disposable bedwetting diapers. In 2002, Procter & Gamble, Kimberly-Clark's primary competitor, introduced Luvs Sleepdrys as a direct competitor to Goodnites. Luvs Sleepdrys were discontinued in 2004, and, from 2004 to 2008, store brands were the primary form of direct competition to Goodnites. In 2008, Procter & Gamble released Pampers Underjams as another direct competitor to Goodnites. In 2020, Procter & Gamble discontinued Pampers Underjams and replaced them with Ninjamas. Currently, Goodnites' competition comes from both Ninjamas and store brand pull-ups or diapers.

References

External links
Goodnites USA
Goodnites English-Canada
Goodnites French-Canada

Products introduced in 1994
Kimberly-Clark brands
Toilet training